Gilles Remiche (1979 – 17 April 2022) was a Belgian director and actor. He studied at the University of East London and began working as an assistant director in 2006. He made his acting debut in 2017 with a minor role in The Benefit of the Doubt.

Remiche later co-starred in Madly in Life (2020), a comedy-drama film directed by Ann Sirot and Raphaël Balboni. The film earned him a Magritte Award for Best Supporting Actor.

Remiche died from cancer on 17 April 2022, at the age of 44.

Selected filmography

References

External links

1979 births
2022 deaths
Belgian film actors
Belgian film directors
Belgian male stage actors
French-language film directors
Magritte Award winners
Mass media people from Brussels
Alumni of the University of East London
Place of death missing
Deaths from cancer in Belgium